The Marlboro M Hoax was a false rumor originating from satire news website Abril Uno on April 1, 2016. It was an April Fools prank.

Hoax 
The article claims that Philip Morris USA, owner of the Marlboro tobacco company, is introducing a new line of marijuana cigarettes called Marlboro M in Colorado and the state of Washington. While fake, the article does have some factual basis, as tobacco companies have shown interest in marijuana since the 1970's. Even though the article was quite obviously satire, the clickbait title was able to make it around the internet before it could be disproved. Some users, upon discovering that there were no 'Marlboro M' cigarettes at their local dispensary, claimed that they would be in stock by the end of 2017.

Basis 
While the article was proven fake, its claims were able gain widespread belief because of past and current events in cannabis culture, which themselves were true. For example, it is true that tobacco companies, including Phillip Morris, were interested in marijuana as a competing product and potentially investing in the cannabis industry, long before rapid legalization came about. Legalization of cannabis in the United States is also a contributing factor to the blind acceptance these claims received, as societal views on marijuana use have largely shifted in recent years. Some tobacco companies have actually began investing in medical marijuana research, as well as joining with marijuana seed investment firms, though they haven't gone as far is to introduce cannabis cigarettes into the market. In 2018 when the hoax appeared, it would be illegal at the US federal level for a large company, such as Philip Morris, to introduce cannabis cigarettes across the country.

References 

Cannabis hoaxes
Philip Morris USA
April Fools' Day jokes